"Baby Bye Bye" is a song co-written and recorded by American country music artist Gary Morris.  It was released in October 1984 as the third single from the album Faded Blue.  The song was written by Morris and Jamie Brantley.

The song was Morris' first No. 1 hit on the Billboard Hot Country Singles chart in the late winter of 1985. The song's single week atop the chart was part of a 15-week run within the Hot Country Singles' chart top 40.

Content
The song is about a man who breaks up with his highly desirable and beautiful, but unfaithful girlfriend.

Chart performance

References

1984 singles
Gary Morris songs
Song recordings produced by Jim Ed Norman
Warner Records singles
1984 songs
Songs written by Gary Morris